Baiju N Nair is an Indian television host, YouTuber, author,  travel and automobile journalist and chief editor of Smart Drive automobile magazine. He won a Kerala Sahitya Akademi Award in 2018. He is the host of the TV show Smart Drive in Asianet News.

Award

Books
Londanilekk Oru Road Yathra
 Silk Route
 Car Paricharanam
 Car Vangumbol
 Nalu Kadalrajyangal

See also
 Kerala Sahitya Akademi Award for Travelogue
 Kerala Sahitya Akademi Award

References

External links
 
 
 

Living people
Indian journalists
Indian writers
People from Kottayam
Year of birth missing (living people)
Recipients of the Kerala Sahitya Akademi Award